The Kamu language, or Gamor, is an extinct indigenous Australian language spoken in Northern Territory, Australia. There were two speakers in 1967.

References

External links 
 Bibliography of Kamu people and language resources, at the Australian Institute of Aboriginal and Torres Strait Islander Studies
 Kamu at the Dalylanguages.org website.

Eastern Daly languages